Melissa Lowther (born 15 May 1996) is an English professional racing cyclist, who last rode for UCI Women's Team . Lowther won the Under-23 British National Road Race Championships in 2017.

Lowther learnt the day before the time trial at the 2018 Commonwealth Games that she would not be allowed to compete because a Team England administrator had neglected to tick a box on an entry form.

Career results
2015
 3rd Scratch Race, Revolution - Round 3, London
2016
 3rd Points Race, Revolution - Round 3, Manchester
2017
 1st  Road race, National Under-23 Road Championships

See also
 List of 2015 UCI Women's Teams and riders

References

External links

1996 births
Living people
English female cyclists
People from Wakefield